The following is a list of notable deaths in April 2002.

Entries for each day are listed alphabetically by surname. A typical entry lists information in the following sequence:
 Name, age, country of citizenship at birth, subsequent country of citizenship (if applicable), reason for notability, cause of death (if known), and reference.

April 2002

1
Albert F. Canwell, 95, American politician, Washington state legislator and anti-communist zealot who helped set the stage for McCarthyism.
Simo Häyhä, 96, Finnish sniper during WWII.
James Karales, 71, American photographer and photo-essayist.
Alfred A. McKethan, 93, American banker and businessman.
K. V. Narayanaswamy, 78, Indian musician.
Umer Rashid, 26, English cricketer, drowning.
John S. Samuel, 88, American Air Force general.

2
B. J. Baker, 74, American singer and songwriter, backup singer for Elvis Presley, Frank Sinatra, Bobby Darin, The Righteous Brothers, Sam Cooke.
Ralph H. Barger, 79, American printer, publisher and politician.
Levi Celerio, 91, Filipino composer and lyricist, recognized as a National Artist of the Philippines in 1997.
Ike Clarke, 87, English football player and manager.
Jack Kruschen, 80, Canadian actor (The Apartment, The War of the Worlds, Webster).
John R. Pierce, 92, American engineer and author, supervised the Bell Labs team which built the first transistor and coined the term "transistor".
Robert Lawson Vaught, 75, American mathematician, and one of the founders of model theory.

3
Fad Gadget, 45, English singer-songwriter, heart attack.
Roy Huggins, 87, American novelist and television producer (Maverick, The Fugitive, The Rockford Files).
Bobby Managoff, 84, American professional wrestler of Armenian descent, heart failure.
Roy Nichols, 81, American baseball player (New York Giants).
Ernst Stojaspal, 77, Austrian football player.
Karl Swanson, 101, American baseball player (Chicago White Sox).
Larry Wagner, 94, American arranger, composer, and bandleader.

4
Leo Brooks, 54, American professional football player (University of Texas, Houston Oilers, St. Louis Cardinals).
Ann Ebsworth, 64, English barrister and judge, first woman appointed to the Queen's Bench Division of the High Court.
Endel Edasi, 72, Soviet (Estonian) swimmer (men's 100 metre freestyle at the 1952 Summer Olympics).
George Francis, 73, British boxing trainer (Frank Bruno, John Conteh, John Mugabi, Cornelius Boza-Edwards).
Pierre Marchand, 62, French publisher, cancer.
John S. Samuel, 88, Major General in the US Air Force.
Hiram Hamilton Ward, 78, American judge (U.S. District Judge of the U.S. District Court for the Middle District of North Carolina).
Charles Winquist, 57, American theologian.

5
Herbert Cahn, 87, German-Swiss archaeologist, numismatist and antiquities-dealer.
Paul Erickson, 86, American baseball player (Chicago Cubs, Philadelphia Phillies, New York Giants).
A. C. Greene, 78, American writer.
Arthur Ponsonby, 11th Earl of Bessborough, 89, British aristocrat.
Sheriff Robinson, 80, American baseball player.
Layne Staley, 34, American singer (Alice in Chains), drug overdose.
Ben Warley, 65, American professional basketball player (Philadelphia 76ers, Baltimore Bullets, Anaheim Amigos).
Kim Won-gyun, 85, North Korean composer and politician, heart failure.

6
Silvia Derbez, 70, Mexican film and television actress
Nobu McCarthy, 67, Canadian actress.
William Patterson, 71, British Anglican priest, Dean of Ely.
Tom Sunkel, 89, American baseball player (St. Louis Cardinals, New York Giants, Brooklyn Dodgers).
Margaret Wingfield, 90, British political activist, President of the Liberal Party.

7
John Agar, 81, American actor, starred in Western and Sci-Fi movies, first husband of Shirley Temple.
Tom Rendall, 68, Canadian ice hockey player.
Conny Vandenbos, 65, Dutch singer.
Tony Zuzzio, 85, American professional football player (Muhlenberg College, Detroit Lions).

8
Sir Nigel Bagnall, 75, British field marshal, professional head of the British Army (Chief of the General Staff).
John Borton, 69, American professional football player (Ohio State, Cleveland Browns).
Carl F. Eifler, 95, American U.S. Army officer, commanded the first OSS covert operations unit during World War II.
María Félix, 88, Mexican film star, considered "the most beautiful face in the history of Mexican cinema".
Eloy Fominaya, 76, American composer, music educator, conductor, violinist and luthier (Augusta Symphony).
Helen Gilbert, 80 American artist.
Giacomo Mancini, 85, Italian politician.
Harvey Quaytman, 64, American painter, cancer.

9
Dorothy Love Coates, 74, American gospel singer, considered one of gospel's great performers.
Harold Coates, 84, Australian politician, member of the New South Wales Legislative Assembly from 1965 to 1976.
Roy Dwight, 69, English footballer.
Pat Flaherty, 76, American professional racecar driver, won the Indianapolis 500 in 1956.
James T. Gallagher, 97, American sports writer and baseball executive.
Kazuo Nakamura, 75, Japanese-Canadian painter and sculptor.
Leopold Vietoris, 110, Austrian mathematician.

10
Haim Cohn, 91, Israeli jurist and politician.
Ed Fleming, 68, American professional basketball player (Niagara University, Rochester Royals, Minneapolis Lakers).
Géza Hofi, 75, Hungarian humorist.
Jai Bihari Lal Khachi, 74, Indian politician, heart attack.
Atanda Fatai Williams, 83, Nigerian Jurist and Chief Justice of Nigeria.

11
Elmer Angsman, 76, American professional football player (Notre Dame, Chicago Cardinals) and football color commentator.
Branko Bauer, 81, Croatian film director.
William Brandon, 87, American author, wrote fiction and non-fiction on Native Americans and the American West.
Bubba Brooks, 79, American jazz tenor saxophonist, a member of Bill Doggett's ensemble.
Héctor Rojas Herazo, 81, Colombian novelist, poet, journalist and painter.
Delphi Lawrence, 76, English actress.
Đỗ Mậu, 85, Vietnamese officer in the Army of the Republic of Vietnam (ARVN).
Niser bin Muhammad Nasr Nawar, Tunesian terrorist, suicide bomb.
Jung Tae Park, South Korean master of taekwondo.
J. William Stanton, 78, American politician (U.S. Representative for Ohio's 11th congressional district).
Stanley Weston, 82, American publisher, sportswriter, artist and photographer, cancer.

12
Howard Pays, 74, English actor.
Gabriel Raksi, 63, Romanian football player.
Kondapalli Seetharamaiah, 87, Indian communist leader.
George Shevelov, 93, Ukrainian scholar.
Henry van Straubenzee, 88, British Army officer.
Safet Zhulali, 59, Albanian Minister of Defence, deposed when President Sali Berisha's government was overthrown in 1997.

13
Alex Baroni, 35, Italian singer, traffic accident.
Ivan Desny, 79, Swiss film actor of Russian descent, appeared in more than 150 films.
Joe Fisher, 85, Canadian professional ice hockey player (Detroit Red Wings).
Augustin Parent, 66, French rugby player.
Álvaro Salvadores, 73, Chilean-Spaniard basketball player.
Robert F. Stephens, 74, American politician, lawyer, and judge.
Vlajko Stojiljković, 65, Serbian politician.

14
Edmée Abetel, 79, Swiss Olympic alpine skier (1952 Winter Olympics women's slalom).
Buck Baker, 83, American stock car race driver and member of the NASCAR Hall of Fame.
Gustave Blouin, 89, Canadian politician and a member of Parliament (House of Commons representing Saguenay, Quebec and Manicouagan, Quebec).
John Boda, 79, American composer and music professor.
Zdenek Chlup, 79, Czechoslovakian Olympic basketball player (basketball at the 1948 Summer Olympics).
Mark Ermler, 69, Russian conductor (Bolshoi Theatre, Moscow Philharmonic Orchestra, Seoul Philharmonic Orchestra).
Sir Michael Kerr, 81, British jurist.
Monal Naval, 21, Indian film actress, suicide by hanging.

15
Moe Keale, 62, American musician of Hawaiian music, and actor, heart attack.
Dave King, 72, English comedian, actor and singer.
Damon Knight, 79, American science fiction author, editor and critic.
Hans-Henrik Krause, 84, Danish actor and film director.
Will Reed, 91, British composer.
Ram Singh Thakuri, 87, Indian freedom fighter, musician and composer.
Chen Ting-shih, 88, Chinese artist.
Byron White, 84, American lawyer and Associate Justice of the Supreme Court of the United States, pneumonia.

16
Billy Ayre, 49, English footballer, cancer.
Gibson Byrd, 79, American artist and professor.
Ruth Fertel, 75, American businesswoman, founder of Ruth's Chris Steak House.
Janusz Kasperczak, 74, Polish Olympic boxer.
Franz Krienbühl, 73, Swiss speed skater.
Robert Urich, 55, American actor (Vega$, Spenser: For Hire, Lonesome Dove, S.W.A.T.).
Hugh Franklin Waters, 69, American judge (U.S. District Judge of the U.S. District Court for the Western District of Arkansas).
Herbert Wernicke, 56, German opera director and set and costume designer.
Walter Wurzburger, 82, American rabbi and professor of philosophy, headed Rabbinical Council of America.

17
Urs-Ulrich Bucher, 75, Swiss Olympic sailor (1960 Star (keelboat) sailing, 1964 Star (keelboat) sailing).
James Copeland, 83, Scottish actor (The 39 Steps, The Private Life of Sherlock Holmes).
Betsy Curtis, 84, American science fiction and fantasy writer.
Srul Irving Glick, 67, Canadian composer, radio producer, and conductor.
Stevan Kragujević, 80, Serbian photojournalist and art photographer.
Tak Shindo, 79, Japanese American musician, composer and arranger.

18
Thor Heyerdahl, 87, Norwegian anthropologist.
Wayne Hightower, 62, American basketball player, heart attack.
Noel T. Keen, 61, American plant physiologist, leukemia.
Cy Laurie, 75, British musician.
Wahoo McDaniel, 63, American Choctaw-Chickasaw gridiron football player and wrestler, complications from diabetes and kidney failure.
Sir Peter Proby, 90, British landowner, Lord-Lieutenant of Cambridgeshire.
Myer Rosenblum, 95, Australian sportsman and lawyer, heart attack.

19
William E. Barber, 82, U.S. Marine Corps colonel (Battle of Iwo Jima, Battle of Chosin Reservoir), awarded the Medal of Honor, bone marrow cancer.
Alberto Beltrán, 79, Mexican painter, engraver and political cartoonist.
Cecil Dennistoun Burney, 79, British-Zambian businessman and politician.
Reginald Rose, 81, American film and television writer, complications of heart failure.
Ross Whicher, 84, Canadian politician and businessman (member of Parliament representing Bruce, Ontario).

20
Phillip Baldwin, 77, American judge (United States circuit judge of the United States Court of Appeals for the Federal Circuit).
Chester Ray Benjamin, 79, American research mycologist, worked for the Department of Agriculture.
Vlastimil Brodský, 81, Czech actor.
Alan Dale, 76, American singer ("Heart of My Heart", "Cherry Pink and Apple Blossom White").
Sarvepalli Gopal, 78, Indian historian, renal failure.
Pierre Rapsat, 53, Belgian singer-songwriter, cancer.
Charles W. Watson, 86, American sculptor and construction executive.

21
Romana Calligaris, 77, Italian freestyle swimmer (women's 100 metre freestyle, women's 4 × 100 metre freestyle relay at the 1952 Summer Olympics).
Sam Dente, 79, American baseball player (Boston Red Sox, St. Louis Browns, Washington Senators, Chicago White Sox, Cleveland Indians).
Sebastian Menke, 91, American Roman Catholic priest.
Red O'Quinn, 76, American professional football player (Wake Forest, Chicago Bears, Philadelphia Eagles).
Ogden Phipps, 93, American stockbroker, thoroughbred horse racing owner/breeder and philanthropist.
Harry Tarraway, 76, British Olympic middle-distance runner (men's 800 metres at the 1948 Summer Olympics).
Terry Walsh, 62, British stuntman.

22
Albrecht Becker, 95, German production designer and actor.
Janet Fox, 89, American actress (Stage Door, Dinner at Eight).
Allen Morris, 92, American historian.
Linda Lovelace, 53, American porn star turned political activist, car crash.
Victor Weisskopf, 93, Austrian-American theoretical physicist, worked on the Manhattan Project.

23
Bob Baker, 75, American heavyweight boxer.
Jay Chiat, 70, American advertising executive, created drum-beating Energizer Bunny and Apple as the "computer for the rest of us".
Jim Cohen, 84, American Negro league baseball player, played for the Indianapolis Clowns from 1946 to 1952.
Bob Faught, 82, American professional basketball player (University of Notre Dame, Cleveland Rebels).
Sam Francis, 88, American football player (Nebraska, Chicago Bears, Brooklyn Dodgers) and coach, and Olympic shot putter.
Ted Kroll, 82, American professional golfer, won eight PGA Tour events and lead the PGA Tour money list in 1956.

24
Trudi Birger, 75, German-born, Israeli-nationalized writer and Holocaust survivor.
Rudolph de Harak, 78, American graphic and environmental designer.
Gloria Escoffery, 78, Jamaican artist, poet, teacher, art critic and journalist.
Barbara Grizzuti Harrison, 67, American journalist, essayist and memoirist, COPD.
Ismith Khan, Trinidad and Tobago-born American author.
George Langdale, 86, British schoolmaster, cricketer and mathematician.
John C. Mabee, 80, American Thoroughbred racehorse owner and breeder, stroke.
Lucien Wercollier, 93, Luxembourg sculptor.
Nadezhda Zhurkina, 81, Russian radio operator and gunner during WW II.

25
Christopher Bowerbank, 61, English architect and raconteur.
Michael Bryant, 74, British actor (Mumsy, Nanny, Sonny and Girly, The Stone Tape, The Ruling Class, Gandhi).
Dick Campbell, 58, American folk rock singer-songwriter and film producer, complications following a lung transplant.
Indra Devi, 102, Russian "yoga teacher to the stars".
Lisa "Left Eye" Lopes, 30, American singer and member of girl group TLC, car crash.

26
Alton Coleman, 46, convicted spree killer, execution by lethal injection.
Red Davis, 86, American baseball player (New York Giants).
Robert Livingston, 83, American physician, neuroscientist, and social activist.
Del Sharbutt, 90, American radio announcer.
Steve Tshwete, 63, South African politician and activist.

27
Guila Bustabo, 86, American concert violinist.
Hillous Butrum, 74, American country musician, best known as a member of Hank Williams Drifting Cowboys.
George Alec Effinger, 55, American science fiction writer (When Gravity Fails, "Schrödinger's Kitten"), received Hugo Award and Nebula Award.
Ruth Handler, 85, inventor of the Barbie doll.
Arthur Owen, 87, British racing driver (born 1915).
Baron Hans Heinrich Thyssen-Bornemisza, 81, German Industrialist and art collector.
Jerry Witte, 86, American baseball player (St. Louis Browns).

28
Albert Béchard, 79, Canadian politician and a member of Parliament (House of Commons for Bonaventure, Quebec).
Robert M. Gagné, 85, American educational psychologist.
Alexander Lebed, 52, Russian general and politician.
Sir Peter Parker, 77, British businessman.
Gerd Sommerhoff, 87, German-born British neuroscientist and humanist.
Lou Thesz, 86, American professional wrestler.
John Wilkinson, 82, American sound mixer (Platoon, Saturday Night Fever, Days of Heaven), Oscar winner (1987).
Gordon Willey, 89, American anthropologist, known for creation of the field of "settlement pattern studies".

29
Bob Akin, 66, American businessman and professional race car driver (two-time Sebring winner).
Sune Andersson, 81, Swedish football player and manager (gold medal winner in football at the 1948 Summer Olympics).
Sverre Bratland, 84, Norwegian military leader, World War II commander at Normandy, a platoon attack near Asten, Netherlands and into northern Germany.
Michael Camille, 44, English art historian, specializing in art of the European Middle Ages.
Henri Caron, 77, French Olympic racewalker (men's 50 kilometres racewalk at the 1948 Summer Olympics).
Ihar Hermianchuk, 41, Belarusian journalist and political activist, cancer.
Liam O'Sullivan, 20, Scottish footballer, drugs overdose. 
Lor Tok, 88, Thai, comedian and actor Thailand National Artist.

30
Kathryn Albertson, 93, American philanthropist.
Goo Arlooktoo, 38, Canadian politician, heart attack.
Freddie Brown, 61, American singer-songwriter.
Noel DaCosta, 72, Nigerian-Jamaican composer, jazz violinist, and choral conductor.
Ida Engel, 98, American actress, television commercial star in her 90s.
Charles Johnston, Baron Johnston of Rockport, 87, British politician
Effie Neal Jones, 82, American civil rights activist.
Leslie Melville, 100, Australian economist, academic and public servant.
Robert Mosley, 74 or 75, American bass-baritone.

References 

2002-04
 04